Kothagudem is a city in Telangana. It serves as the headquarters of the Bhadradri Kothagudem district of the Indian state of Telangana. It was a portion of large Zamindari estate known as Husanabad Shankaragiri or Palvancha Zamindari in the Nizam's Dominion. Estate name was given by Captain Glasfurd. The Zamindar of Bhadrachalam was Zamindar of Palvancha also.

Geography 
It has an average elevation of 89 metres (295 ft) above sea level. The North of Kothagudem borders Chhattisgarh state which is approximately 120 km from the town.

Kothagudem is known for its record high temperatures during summer, often crossing  mark.

Climate

Government and politics 
Kothagudem Municipality was constituted in 1971 and is classified as a first grade municipality with 33 election wards.

Education 

 University College of Engineering, Kakatiya University

References 

Cities and towns in Bhadradri Kothagudem district
Khammam task force articles